António José da Conceição Oliveira (born 14 October 1946), known as Toni, is a Portuguese former footballer who played as a midfielder, and a coach.

A Portugal international on more than 30 occasions, his career was mainly associated with Benfica. He totalled 22 major honours with his main club as both a player and manager, and also worked in the latter capacity in six other countries.

Club career
Born in the village of Mogofores in Anadia, Aveiro District, Toni started playing organized football at local Anadia FC, and joined Académica de Coimbra at the age of 18 when he was signed by manager Mário Wilson. During his spell with the latter club, he was rarely played over three Primeira Liga seasons.

On 9 June 1968, Toni joined S.L. Benfica for a transfer fee of 1,305,000 escudos. He scored one goal in 22 games in his debut campaign, helping his team to the national championship.

Toni was part of the legendary Jimmy Hagan-led sides that won back-to-back domestic leagues from 1971–1973, losing only one match in 60; to this feat, he contributed three goals from 50 appearances. Before retiring in 1981 at 34, he appeared in 391 competitive matches with his main club (23 goals), and was named Portuguese Footballer of the Year in 1972.

International career
Toni earned 32 caps for Portugal, his debut coming on 12 October 1969 in a 1–0 away loss against Romania for the 1970 FIFA World Cup qualifiers. His last match occurred eight years later, in a 2–0 friendly defeat in France.

Toni was part of the country's squad at the 1972 Brazil Independence Cup, lost to the hosts.

Coaching career
One year after retiring, Toni began working as assistant at Benfica, successively holding the position under Sven-Göran Eriksson, Pál Csernai, John Mortimore and Ebbe Skovdahl. He was promoted to head coach early into the 1987–88 season, and led the team to the second place in the league and the final of the European Cup, lost to PSV Eindhoven on penalties.

Toni managed Benfica to its 28th national championship in the 1988–89 campaign, losing only twice in 38 matches. After replacing fired Tomislav Ivić in November 1992, he won another league in 1994.

Starting in 1994, Toni spent one year working abroad, with Ligue 1 side FC Girondins de Bordeaux and Sevilla FC in the Spanish La Liga. He won the UEFA Intertoto Cup with the former, but was sacked due to poor results in the domestic front; with the latter, he arrived at the Ramón Sánchez Pizjuán Stadium alongside player Emílio Peixe, being relieved of his duties on 15 October 1995 following a 0–3 home loss against RCD Espanyol.

In 1999, Toni assisted compatriot Carlos Queiroz at the United Arab Emirates national team. In December of the following year, the former returned to Benfica for a third spell after José Mourinho resigned from the position as new president Manuel Vilarinho had declared his intention to bring in Toni during the election campaign, with Mourinho leaving midway through 2000–01.

In the next years, Toni was in charge of Shenyang Jinde FC (Chinese Super League), Al-Ahly SC (Egyptian Premier League, winning the domestic Supercup), Ettifaq FC (Saudi Professional League, leading them to the fourth place) and Al-Sharjah SCC (UAE Arabian Gulf League). During the 2010 FIFA World Cup, he acted as match analyst for Ivory Coast.

Toni returned to Saudi Arabia in summer 2010, reaching the semi-finals of the AFC Champions League with Ittihad FC. On 9 June 2012, he signed a two-year contract with Iran Pro League club Tractor SC.

After failing to qualify from the 2013 Champions League group stage, it was announced Toni's contract would not be renewed, and he left in May. However, he returned on 28 January 2014, winning that season's Iranian Hazfi Cup after defeating Sanat Mes Kerman FC.

On 12 February 2015, Toni returned to Tractor for a third stint after agreeing to a one-and-a-half-year deal. He left his post in December.

Personal life
Toni's son, also named António, was also a football player and manager.

Managerial statistics

Honours

Player
Académica
Taça de Portugal runner-up: 1966–67

Benfica
Primeira Divisão: 1968–69, 1970–71, 1971–72, 1972–73, 1974–75, 1975–76, 1976–77, 1980–81
Taça de Portugal: 1968–69, 1969–70, 1971–72, 1979–80
Supertaça Cândido de Oliveira: 1979
Taça de Honra (6)

Individual
Portuguese Footballer of the Year: 1972

Manager
Benfica
Primeira Divisão: 1988–89, 1993–94
Taça de Portugal: 1992–93
Supertaça Cândido de Oliveira runner-up: 1987, 1993
European Cup runner-up: 1987–88

Bordeaux
UEFA Intertoto Cup: 1995

Al-Ahly
Egyptian Super Cup: 2003

Al-Ittifaq
Saudi Crown Prince Cup runner-up: 2008
GCC Champions League runner-up: 2007

Ittihad
King Cup of Champions runner-up: 2011

Tractor
Iranian Hazfi Cup: 2013–14

Kazma
Kuwait Federation Cup: 2017–18

Individual
IFCA Manager of the Month: February 2015

References

Further reading

External links

1946 births
Living people
People from Anadia, Portugal
Sportspeople from Aveiro District
Portuguese footballers
Association football midfielders
Primeira Liga players
Anadia F.C. players
Associação Académica de Coimbra – O.A.F. players
S.L. Benfica footballers
North American Soccer League (1968–1984) players
Las Vegas Quicksilver players
Portugal under-21 international footballers
Portugal international footballers
Portuguese expatriate footballers
Expatriate soccer players in the United States
Portuguese expatriate sportspeople in the United States
Portuguese football managers
Primeira Liga managers
S.L. Benfica managers
Ligue 1 managers
FC Girondins de Bordeaux managers
La Liga managers
Sevilla FC managers
Chinese Super League managers
Guangzhou City F.C. managers
Egyptian Premier League managers
Al Ahly SC managers
Saudi Professional League managers
Ettifaq FC managers
Ittihad FC managers
Kuwait Premier League managers
Kazma SC managers
Persian Gulf Pro League managers
Tractor S.C. managers
Portuguese expatriate football managers
Expatriate football managers in Spain
Expatriate football managers in France
Expatriate football managers in China
Expatriate football managers in Egypt
Expatriate football managers in Saudi Arabia
Expatriate football managers in Kuwait
Expatriate football managers in Iran
Portuguese expatriate sportspeople in Spain
Portuguese expatriate sportspeople in France
Portuguese expatriate sportspeople in China
Portuguese expatriate sportspeople in Egypt
Portuguese expatriate sportspeople in Saudi Arabia
Portuguese expatriate sportspeople in Kuwait
Portuguese expatriate sportspeople in Iran